Elmhurst is an unincorporated community in Monroe County, West Virginia, United States. It is located along County Route 10.

Unincorporated communities in Monroe County, West Virginia
Unincorporated communities in West Virginia